Dome Creek station is on the Canadian National Railway mainline in Dome Creek, British Columbia. Via Rail's Jasper – Prince Rupert train calls at the station as a flag stop.

References

External links 
Via Rail Station Description

Via Rail stations in British Columbia